Enea Masiero (8 November 1933 in Lonigo – 31 March 2009 in Milan) was an Italian professional football player and coach, who played as a midfielder.

Honours

Club
Inter
 Serie A champion: 1962–63.

References

1933 births
2009 deaths
Italian footballers
Serie A players
Inter Milan players
U.C. Sampdoria players
Italian football managers
Inter Milan managers
U.S. Salernitana 1919 managers
A.S.D. SolbiaSommese Calcio managers
FC Lugano managers
Mantova 1911 managers
Sportspeople from the Province of Vicenza
Association football midfielders
A.C.D. Trissino-Valdagno players
Footballers from Veneto